Nam-il is a Korean masculine given name. Its meaning differs based on the hanja used to write each syllable of the name. There are five hanja with the reading "nam" and ten hanja with the reading "il" on the South Korean government's official list of hanja which may be registered for use in given names.

People with this name include:
 Kim Nam-il (born 1977), South Korean football player
 Paek Nam-il, North Korean politician

See also
 List of Korean given names
 Nam Il (1913-1976), North Korean politician, foreign minister 1953-1967

References

Korean masculine given names